The seventh edition of the Tour of Flanders for Women cycling race was held on 4 April 2010. The race started in Oudenaarde and finished in Meerbeke. It was the second leg of the 2010 UCI Women's Road World Cup. The event was won by Belgian rider Grace Verbeke.

Race summary
Dutchwoman Adrie Visser and Belgian Grace Verbeke broke away on the Molenberg, the third climb of the day after 75 km, and continued to work together until the Bosberg. On the Bosberg, the last climb of the day, Verbeke left Visser behind and soloed to Meerbeke to narrowly stay ahead of the sprinting group. Marianne Vos won the sprint for second place before Kirsten Wild. Visser, caught by the returning group, finished fifth.

Results

References

Tour of Flanders for Women
Tour
2010 UCI Women's Road World Cup